Yeniseysk Airport  is an airport in Russia located  northwest of Yeniseysk, close to the left bank of the Yenisey River. Although little used by passengers these days, the airport is highly photogenic for its quaintly decrepit timber terminal building and vast graveyard of small and mid-sized Soviet era planes, slowly rusting around its runways.

History
Yeniseisk Airport dates back to 1934 making it one of the region's oldest, a necessity for supplying settlements in terrain which was essentially impassable for hundreds of kilometers around. In the post-war years, the airport developed rapidly as a transport hub for passengers to outlying settlements as well as forestry workers and geologists, geophysicists and drillers en route to the Angarsk deposits.
In the 1970s there were flights to Krasnoyarsk, Norilsk and a service by Il-18 to Moscow. In recent years, higher un-subsidised air-transport costs combined with the construction of a good asphalt road to Krasnoyarsk (and passable unpaved roads to outlying villages) has seen the collapse of demand for pricey air-shuttles.

Specifications
The airport is considered third class; capable of handling helicopters and smaller aircraft including Antonov An-2 light bi-planes, An-12 turbo-props, 44-seater An-24s, and Yak-40 tri-engined regional jets. The airport has a certified fuel and lubricants laboratory and an aviation-technical base with An-2 planes and Mi-8 helicopters, to provide socially significant transportation to remote settlements of the middle Yenisey region. However, the airport is reportedly in serious need of reconstruction.

Flight traffic
The table below shows the sharply declining passenger numbers using the airport from 2014. As of 2017 the airport had suspended fixed-wing passenger services pending reconstruction and sponsorship.

Current air service is only by helicopter shuttle to Mayskoe (Майское) and to Krivlyak (Кривляк) via Yartsevo (Ярцево) along with fire-fighting, air-ambulance and on-demand services through AeroGeo (АэроГео).

External links
Airports of the Krasnoyarsk region

References

Airports built in the Soviet Union
Airports in Krasnoyarsk Krai
Airport